Punch and Jody is a 1974 NBC TV movie starring Glenn Ford and directed by Barry Shear.

Synopsis
It is the story of a cruel man who abandons his wife and daughter and goes to work in a circus around the country. Years later he meets his daughter, who is now a rambling gypsy.

Cast

References 
Movies made for television: the telefeature and the mini-series, 1964–1986, by Alvin H. Marill
TV guide, Vol 34 by Triangle Publications

External links 

1974 television films
1974 films
American drama television films
1974 drama films
NBC network original films
Films directed by Barry Shear
1970s American films